Westmorland Union Elementary School District is a school district serving students in grades K-8 in Imperial County, California. The current superintendent is Richard Cordero. Linda Morse served as superintendent in 2011. The district's mascot is the Roadrunner, and had 402 students enrolled in 2019.

References

External links
 

School districts in Imperial County, California